The Legislative Assembly for the Australian Capital Territory (known in short as the ACT Legislative Assembly) is the unicameral legislature of the Australian Capital Territory (ACT). It sits in the Legislative Assembly Building on Civic Square, close to the centre of the city of Canberra.

Creation
The Assembly was created by four acts of the Commonwealth Parliament in 1988, including the Australian Capital Territory (Self-Government) Act 1988. The first election was held on 4 March 1989 and the assembly first sat on 11 May that year. Until this point, the ACT had been directly administered by the Commonwealth Government. It replaced the House of Assembly (also known for a period as the Legislative Assembly), which existed from 1976 to 1986, but had no executive power, with a principal function of advising the Commonwealth on matters relating to the Territory.

Membership
Since October 2016, the Legislative Assembly has 25 members elected from five electorates, Brindabella, Ginninderra, Kurrajong, Murrumbidgee and Yerrabi, each having five members. Members are elected for four-year terms by the Hare-Clark system, a variation of the Single Transferable Vote form of proportional representation.

Previously the Legislative Assembly had 17 members elected from three electorates—Brindabella and Ginninderra, each of which had five members, and Molonglo, which had seven members. In 2014 the Assembly voted to expand the number of members, with the change taking effect at the 2016 election.

The Assembly was originally elected by a modified d'Hondt system, but a 1992 referendum supported the Hare-Clark method, and this was introduced in the 1995 election.

Members of the Legislative Assembly vote to elect a Chief Minister—in practice, the leader of whichever party can form government (known as the ACT Government). The Chief Minister, in turn, selects ministers to form a cabinet. The leader of the second-largest party in the Assembly usually becomes the Leader of the Opposition.

Election dates for the Assembly are fixed in legislation, with elections held on the third Saturday in October every four years (until 1997, elections were held in February). The term of the Assembly was increased in 2004 from three to four years. The next election is due on Saturday 19 October 2024.

Salary
 MLAs were paid a base salary of $164,382. Most members were entitled to an additional loading, up to a maximum of $345,202 for the chief minister.

Local government functions
Unlike the legislatures of the other mainland states and territories, the Assembly also has the functions of a local council; the city of Canberra has no other local government.

Enactment of legislation
The ACT is unique among Australian states and self-governing territories, as it has no vice-regal post exercising authority as the representative of the monarch, such as a governor or an Administrator. The functions vested in a state Governor or territorial Administrator as nominal head of the Executivecommissioning government, proroguing parliament and enacting legislationare exercised by the Assembly itself and by the Chief Minister. Instead of vice-regal or regal assent, a Bill passed by the ACT Legislative Assembly is enacted on "notification"publication in the Government Gazette of a notice authorised by the Chief Minister. However, the Governor-General of Australia does have the power to dissolve the Assembly if it is "incapable of effectively performing its functions or is conducting its affairs in a grossly improper manner".

Powers
As with the Northern Territory Legislative Assembly, the ACT Legislative Assembly lacks the full powers of a state legislature. Section 122 of the Constitution of Australia provides that the Commonwealth Parliament "may make laws for the government of any territory" surrendered by any State to the Commonwealth.  The Governor-General, on the advice of the Executive, previously had the power to override laws passed by the Assembly. Although this was rare in practice, the Civil Unions Act 2006, which allowed same-sex couples to enter into "civil unions" was overruled following concerns that the civil unions mimicked marriage. In July 2006, the Federal Government again threatened to overrule the ACT Stanhope Government's anti-terror legislation, which was not consistent with other state laws. In 2011 the Federal Parliament passed a private senator's bill which removed this power in respect to both the Australian Capital Territory and the Northern Territory.

Current distribution of seats
The following is the distribution of seats after the 2020 Australian Capital Territory general election.

Current sitting government/ Coalition 
The current sitting government is made up of a majority of 10 (40%) Labor held seats, 9 (36%) Liberal held seats and 6 (24%) Greens held seats. The current Chief Minister, Treasurer, Minister for Climate Action, Minister for Economic Development and Minister for Tourism, is Andrew Barr. He is the ‘Governing Leader’ of the territory.

The ACT Greens party has had a significant presence in the ACT Legislative Assembly since the party's formation, having formed minority or coalition governments with the ACT Labor Party since 2008. Therefore, the ACT has the only Labor-Greens coalition in the country.

See also 

 Government of the Australian Capital Territory
 2020 Australian Capital Territory general election
 Human Rights Act 2004
 Members of the Australian Capital Territory Legislative Assembly
 Parliaments of the Australian states and territories

Notes

References

External links 
 Legislative Assembly for the Australian Capital Territory

 
Australian Capital Territory
1988 establishments in Australia